José Francisco Peña Guaba (Santo Domingo; 5 October 1963 –) is a politician and diplomat of the Dominican Republic (DR), who served as General Consul of the DR to Panama in the 1980s, as Deputy for the Institutional Social Democratic Bloc (1998–2002), and as Executive Director of the National Institute of Price Stabilization (2004–2007). He is the eldest male son of the late politicians José Francisco Peña Gómez (1937–1998) and Julia Idalia Guaba Martínez (c.1937–2008).

References 

1963 births
People from Santo Domingo
Dominican Republic people of Haitian descent
Dominican Revolutionary Party politicians
Social Democratic Institutional Bloc politicians
Members of the Chamber of Deputies of the Dominican Republic
Presidents of political parties in the Dominican Republic
Living people